Hiver 54, l'abbé Pierre is a 1989 French film, directed by Denis Amar, and starring Lambert Wilson and Claudia Cardinale. Supporting actor Robert Hirsch won a Best Supporting Actor award from the French Academy of Cinema for the film.

Plot
Based on a true story, the film recounts the efforts by a parish priest, Father Pierre, to gain assistance from the government for the homeless, who after World War II were living in poverty and suffering from one of the coldest winters on record. His plea, which was published in newspapers, roused public support and resulted in the establishment of a charity, "Les Chiffoniers d'Emmaus" (The Ragpickers of Emmaus) to raise funds for them. The charity is still operational.

Cast
 Lambert Wilson – Father Pierre
 Claudia Cardinale – Helene Vannier
 Robert Hirsch – Raoul
 Bernie Bonvoisin – Castaing
 Isabelle Petit-Jacques – Mademoiselle Coutaz
 Stephane Butet – Jean
 Wladimir Yordanoff – Senator Charmat
 Philippe Leroy-Beaulieu – Jacques
 Laurent Terzieff – Press Boss
 Bernard Lefort – Paris Prefect of Police

Awards
Robert Hirsch won the César Award for Best Supporting Actor from the Académie des Arts et Techniques du Cinéma in 1990.

References

1988 films
French biographical films
Films scored by Philippe Sarde
1980s biographical films
1980s French-language films
1980s French films